Dasan Alexander Robinson (born June 6, 1984, in Evanston, Illinois) is a retired American soccer player.

Career

College and Amateur
Robinson grew up in the Cleveland area and graduated from Elyria High School. He played college soccer at the University of Dayton for four years, where he finished with 6 goals and 13 assists in 68 matches, and spent three seasons with Chicago Fire Premier in the USL Premier Development League.

Professional
Robinson was drafted in the second round, 22nd overall, by Chicago Fire in the 2006 MLS Supplemental Draft and played for Chicago into the 2011 MLS season.

He was traded to Toronto FC on July 28, 2011, for Dan Gargan and a second-round 2012 MLS SuperDraft pick. Robinson made his debut for Toronto on August 18 in the CONCACAF Champions League group stage against Tauro F.C., a 2–1 away victory for TFC.

Robinson's stay in Toronto lasted less than two months as he was traded to Los Angeles Galaxy on September 15, 2011, in exchange for Kyle Davies. At season's end, Los Angeles declined his 2012 contract option and he entered the 2011 MLS Re-Entry Draft. After no other club selected him, Los Angeles exercised its option to retain his MLS rights.

On January 27, 2012, Robinson announced his retirement via his Twitter account.

Coaching
Robinson is currently involved in coaching in the Chicago area through the private coaching service, CoachUp.

Honors

Los Angeles Galaxy
Major League Soccer- MLS Cup (1): 2011
Major League Soccer- Western Conference Championship (1): 2011
Major League Soccer - Supporters' Shield (1): 2011

Chicago Fire
Major League Soccer- Lamar Hunt U.S. Open Cup (1): 2006

References

External links
 

1984 births
Living people
American soccer players
Association football defenders
Chicago Fire FC draft picks
Chicago Fire FC players
Chicago Fire U-23 players
Dayton Flyers men's soccer players
LA Galaxy players
Major League Soccer players
People from Elyria, Ohio
Soccer players from Illinois
Sportspeople from Evanston, Illinois
Toronto FC players
USL League Two players